Liuzhou (573) is a Type 054A frigate of the People's Liberation Army Navy. She was commissioned on 26 December 2012.

Development and design 

The Type 054A carries HQ-16 medium-range air defence missiles and anti-submarine missiles in a vertical launching system (VLS) system. The HQ-16 has a range of up to 50  km, with superior range and engagement, angles to the Type 054's HQ-7. The Type 054A's VLS uses a hot launch method; a shared common exhaust system is sited between the two rows of rectangular launching tubes.

The four AK-630 close-in weapon systems (CIWS) of the Type 054 were replaced with two Type 730 CIWS on the Type 054A. The autonomous Type 730 provides improved reaction time against close-in threats.

Construction and career 
Liuzhou was launched on 10 December 2011 at the Hudong-Zhonghua Shipyard in Shanghai. Commissioned on 26 December 2012.

On July 10, 2013, Liuzhou and Yukun of Dalian Maritime University held an open ship day at the container terminal in Nantong City, Jiangsu Province during the 9th China Navigation Day, which was open to the public. The event lasted 3 days.

On September 3, 2013, Liuzhou, Lanzhou and Poyanghu formed a fleet of ships, crossing the Pacific Ocean, crossing the Strait of Magellan and entering the South Atlantic. Visits from Lesotho, Rio de Janeiro, Brazil and Buenos Aires, Argentina. The visit lasted 99 days, with a voyage of nearly 30,000 nautical miles, setting a record for the PLA Navy's first joint military exercise with a foreign navy in the South Atlantic and the first visit to Argentina. On December 11, 2013, Liuzhou and others returned to a certain military port in Zhanjiang after completing their visit.

In mid-January 2014, the formation of Hengshui, Liuzhou, Yueyang and Sanya completed several offensive and defensive exercises in the training waters.

Hengshui participated in RIMPAC 2016.

Gallery

References 

2011 ships
Ships built in China
Type 054 frigates